Jerry Mynatt (born c. 1968) is a former American football player and coach.  He served as the head football coach at Pikeville College—now known as the University of Pikeville—in Pikeville, Kentucky for three seasons, from 2003 to 2005, compiling a record of 20–11. Mynatt was selected "Coach of the Year" in the Mid-South Conference in 2005. Selected as one of the "Hottest Coaches in America" the same year by "American Football Monthly" magazine. Mynatt along with his entire 2005 squad was inducted into the University of Pikeville Sports Hall of Fame in 2019.

References

Year of birth missing (living people)
1960s births
Living people
American football wide receivers
Brevard Tornados football coaches
Carson–Newman Eagles football players
Charleston Southern Buccaneers football coaches
Elon Phoenix football coaches
East Tennessee State Buccaneers football coaches
East Tennessee State Buccaneers football players
Orlando Predators players
Pikeville Bears football coaches
High school football coaches in Tennessee
Players of American football from Tennessee